The End of the World as We Know It, or its abbreviation TEOTWAWKI, may refer to:

 A phrase used in survivalism
 "TEOTWAWKI" (Fear the Walking Dead), a 2017 episode of the TV series Fear the Walking Dead
 "TEOTWAWKI", a 1998 episode in season 3 of the TV series Millennium
 TEOTWAWKI: The End of the World as We Know It, a 1997-1998 novel in the novel series Patriots

See also
 "It's the End of the World as We Know It (And I Feel Fine)", a 1987 song by R.E.M.
 It's the End of the World as We Know It (EP), a 2012 EP by Steve Aoki
 End of the world (disambiguation)